The Women's United Soccer Association, often abbreviated to the WUSA, was the world's first women's soccer league in which all the players were paid as professionals. Founded in February 2000, the league began its first season in April 2001 with eight teams in the United States. The league suspended operations on September 15, 2003, shortly after the end of its third season, after making cumulative losses of around US$100 million.

Television coverage
At various times, games were televised on TNT, CNNSI, ESPN2, PAX TV, and various local and regional sports channels via Comcast, Cox, Fox, AT&T, and MSG.

TNT and CNN/SI (2001)

TNT broadcast the very first WUSA game on April 21, 2001, which was contest between the Atlanta Beat and New York Power at Bobby Dodd Stadium in Atlanta. Former U.S. national team member Wendy Gebauer Palladino helped called the game alongside broadcaster JP Dellacamera and American soccer great Michelle Akers. About 22 games were scheduled to be broadcast nationally on TNT or CNN/SI in 2001. 15 games were initially expected to be shown on TNT and seven games on CNN/SI over the course of June to August. The deal included broadcast of playoffs and the championship game, the Founders Cup. During a four-year span, TNT and CNN/SI were due to televise at least 88 games, under a $3 million TV contract.

Ratings were not available for CNN/SI for the 2001 season as the cable TV provider did not reach enough households to be a statistical factor.

Pax (2002–2003)
After the 2001 season, the WUSA opted out of its four-year agreement to go with a two-year pact with the Pax network. The WUSA's reasoning that Pax's offer for a 4 p.m. Saturday timeslot was more desirable than the noon timeslot that TNT offered.

The change from TNT and CNN/SI to Pax however, may have immediately depressed ratings by confusing fans. To be more specific, the WUSA's ratings plunged from the 0.4 to 0.2 average it got on TNT to a 0.1 average on Pax. In other words, where as an average of 425,000 households tuned in to watch the games on TNT, fewer than 100,000 watched them on Pax. Keep in mind that Pax was a station available in 90 million, 5 million more than TNT. The move to Pax also came as AOL Time Warner considered morphing CNN/SI into a basketball channel that would be co-owned with the National Basketball Association.

Pax's coverage in itself, concerned the broadcast of the WUSA Game of the Week, on 19 consecutive Saturdays beginning in April at 4:00 p.m. (ET). In 2003, the league wouldn't decide on the opponents for the final Pax Game of the Week on August 9 in order to provide soccer fans with the best possible matchup with playoff implications. The decision on the two opponents for the August 9 game would be made in early August. In total, Pax was scheduled to televise 18 regular season games and one WUSA Playoff Semifinal in the second week of August.

Pax would receive certain cross-promotional opportunities with the league, including signs at each team venue, although the WUSA would handle ad sales for the games. The agreement carried a reported value of $2 million.

ESPN2 (2003)

For the WUSA's third and final season, they announced that ESPN2 would join Pax in broadcasting 23 league games in 2003. This would begin with a rematch of Founders Cup II with the Washington Freedom visit the Carolina Courage on April 5. ESPN2 was scheduled to broadcast only four of the 23 nationally televised games. This included the All-Star Game on June 19 and the Founders Cup on August 24. Beth Mowins and Anson Dorrance handled WUSA games on not just Pax but ESPN2 also.

The WUSA ultimately scored a 0.1 percent rating on Pax and 0.2 percent on ESPN2.

List of broadcasters

Local coverage

WUSA Founders Cup broadcasters

See also
Women's Professional Soccer on television
National Women's Soccer League on television

References

External links
WUSA league and franchise directory

Turner Sports
ESPN2 original programming
TNT (American TV network) original programming
CNN/SI original programming
PAX TV original programming
 
Soccer on United States television
History of sports broadcasting